Sanming (Foochow Romanized: Săng-mìng),  also known as Minzhong, is a prefecture-level city in western Fujian province, China. It borders Nanping City to the north, Fuzhou City to the east, Quanzhou City to the southeast, Longyan City to the south and the province of Jiangxi to the west. Sanming lies between Wuyi and Daiyun mountains.

Geography and climate

Sanming is well known by its beautiful nature landscape with different landforms, including unique Danxia Landform and  abundant Karst topography. The most famous spots include global geopark Taining Golden Lake in Taining County, Yuhua Cave in Jiangle County and  Goose Cave in Ninghua County.

Demographics
According to the 2010 Census, Sanming has a population of 2,503,338, 70,687 inhabitants less than in 2000 Census (the average annual population growth for the period 2000-2010 was of -0.28%). The emigration of population from Sanming to other areas of Fujian is a constant process, even encouraged by government politics since the 1960s.

Administration
The prefecture-level city of Sanming administers 2 districts, 1 county-level city, 8 counties. The information here presented is in km² and using data from 2010 Census.

History
In 1940 Sanyuan County was established. In 1956, Mingxi and Sanyuan Counties were combined to Sanming County, then in 1960 it was replaced with Sanming city.

Environment and tourism
Sanming has four well preserved and protected National Parks. The city was labeled as the most "green" city of the most "green" province in China.

Da Jin Hu, which is the most famous tourist spot in Sanming, is also well known as Taining Gorden Lake Geopark marked by UNESCO. The Geopark is famous for its unique Danxia Landform. The lake situated inside Taining County at the south end of Wuyi Mountain is the major State-level place of scenic beauty with the length of 60-plus kilometres and water area of more than 50 thousand mu. The best tour season of Taining Jinhu Lake is from April to October each year.

Besides, there are quite a number of places of historic interest and scenic beauty which include the State-level Taining Jinhu Lake, Yong-an Taoyuan Cave--------Linying Stone Forest, and the provincial level Jiangle Yuhua Cave, Sha Xian Qixian Cave, Ninghua Tian-er Cave and Meilie Ruiyun Mountain in Sanming. The natural reserves in Jiangle Longxi mountain, Xingkou Geshikao, Shaxian Nanmu Forest and Yong-an Tianbao Rock have been well known for the rare animals. The ancient architectural structure in Taining, Shibi Village, the originating place of the Hakkas in Ninghua and the birthplace of Zhu Xi in Youxi have all been noticeable both in China and overseas.

Yong-an Taoyuan Cave, situated by Yan River on the north of Yong-an City, is a major State-level place of scenic beauty with an area of 10 kilometres.

The architectural structure group built in the ancient Ming Dynasty situated at the center of the urban district of Taining County is a State-level cultural relics under protection, having a high value in studying the ancient Chinese architecture, especially that in the Ming Dynasty.

The city is served by Sanming Shaxian Airport.

Sanming University is the sole university in Sanming.

Cuisine

Local food style in Sanming City normally includes various snacks especially the famous Sha County Snacks. Sha County snack is one of well-known snack styles in China, which can be found in hundreds of cities around mainland China.

Sha County snacks have a long history and are known to be living artifacts of the Han people's food culture.

Currently, 39 varieties of Sha County snacks have been labeled as "Famous Chinese Snacks" and 63 kinds as "Famous Fujian Snacks." The China Cuisine Association awarded Sha County the title of "Snack Culture City“ in China on December 8, 2006.

The production process of Sha County snacks was listed in Fujian intangible cultural heritage in 2007, and has been declared a national intangible cultural heritage. Representing Fujian, Sha County snacks are also available on the Chinese Food Street at the Shanghai 2010 World Expo.

Besides Sha County snacks, Yong'an snacks and Ninghua County snacks attract local people a lot as well.

Twin towns – sister cities
 Lansing, United States

References

External links

Government website of Sanming
Sanming Window

 
Cities in Fujian
Prefecture-level divisions of Fujian